Karavasta Lagoon is the largest lagoon in Albania and one of the largest adjoining the Mediterranean Sea, spanning an area of . Karavasta is part of the Divjakë Karavasta National Park and is separated from the Adriatic Sea by a large strip of sand. It sprawls across the Myzeqe coastal plain near Divjakë and some  near Lushnjë.

Karavasta hosts many pine trees and small sandy islands. It is renowned for hosting the Dalmatian pelican; 6.4% of the Europe's population of the Dalmatian pelican is found in Karavasta. The lagoon falls within the Illyrian deciduous forests terrestrial ecoregion of the Palearctic Mediterranean forests, woodlands, and scrub biome. The climate is typically mediterranean.

The lagoon is located inside the boundaries of Divjaka-Karavasta National Park and has been recognised as a wetland of international importance by designation under the Ramsar Convention. The lagoon has been identified as an Important Bird Area by BirdLife International, because it supports significant numbers of the populations of various bird species.

The Karavasta Lagoon is within the List of Ramsar wetlands of international importance and is part of the Divjake-Karavasta National Park.

Since disinfection campaigns have long been halted, the area is known to have a very active mosquito season. However, in 2014, disinfection campaigns have started and a park rehabilitation project has been initiated by the national authorities. It included a hunting moratorium which revived bird-watching activities.

See also 

 Divjaka-Karavasta National Park 
 Geography of Albania
 Lagoons of Albania

References 

 

 
Karavasta
Wetlands of Albania
Ramsar sites in Albania
Geography of Fier County
Tourist attractions in Fier County
Important Bird Areas of Albania
Albanian Adriatic Sea Coast